Bronisław Pięcik (1936March 25, 2010) was a Polish precision mechanic who was renowned for the elaborate medium and large-sized Nativity scenes called Kraków szopka that he built. Pięcik first took part in the Kraków Nativity Scene Contest in 1962. By the time of his death in 2010, he had competed a total of 41 times in the contests, placing first 22 times in multiple categories.

Kraków szopka
While Pięcik mainly built the Kraków szopka himself, he also worked on some of them with his wife Maria and his granddaughter Roksana Rutkowska. Each szopka would generally take him upwards of a thousand hours to build, while some took even more than that. For example, his szopka entry for 2004 took him more than 1,000 hours to build. He constructed his szopka according to the characteristics of the genre, which meant that they only contained historical, architectural elements found in Kraków as the backdrop. He was particularly fond of using buildings found along the Royal Route in Kraków in his szopka, which he knew like the back of his hand. In 2003, Pięcik and his granddaughter Roksana Rutkowska took 1st place in the middle-sized division with their 172 cm tall szopka that reproduced in minute detail the Veit Stoss altarpiece from St. Mary's Basilica in Kraków.

More than a dozen of his nativity scenes are housed in the szopka collection of the Historical Museum of Kraków. Many others are in private collections. His prize-winning szopka from 2004 was sold to a collector in Denmark. While working in Kuwait, Pięcik built a Kraków szopka that is housed at a cathedral in Baghdad, Iraq.

Placings
1967 – 1st place together with Tadeusz Gillert, Maciej Moszew, and Witold Głuch

Medium-sized Kraków szopka 
1977 – 1st place
1982 – 1st place
1989 – 1st place together with Andrzej Morański and Ryszard Kijak
1997 – 1st place 
1998 – 1st place together with Roman Sochacki
2002 – 1st place
2003 – Pięcik and Roksana Rutkowska shared 1st place with Roman Sochacki and Marek Głuch
2009 – 1st place

Large-sized Kraków szopka 
1979 – 1st place
1980 – 1st place
1983 – 1st place
1993 – 1st place together with Witold Głuch
1999 – 1st place 
2000 – 1st place 
2001 – 1st place 
2002 – 1st place
2003 – shared 1st place with Tadeusz Gillert, Piotr Stremecki and Małgorzata Malicka
2004 – 1st place 
2005 – 1st place 
2006 – 1st place 
2007 – shared 1st place with Leszek Zarzycki
2009 – shared 2nd place with Władysław Słaboński

References 
 Archival material from the Department of Folklore and Tradition at the Historical Museum of Kraków.
 

1936 births
2010 deaths
Burials at Rakowicki Cemetery
Polish artisans
Outsider artists